A place of worship is a specially designed structure or space where individuals or a group of people such as a congregation come to perform acts of devotion, veneration, or religious study. A building constructed or used for this purpose is sometimes called a house of worship. Temples, churches, mosques, and synagogues are examples of structures created for worship. A monastery may serve both to house those belonging to religious orders and as a place of worship for visitors. Natural or topographical features may also serve as places of worship, and are considered holy or sacrosanct in some religions; the rituals associated with the Ganges river are an example in Hinduism.

Under International Humanitarian Law and the Geneva Conventions, religious buildings are offered special protection, similar to the protection guaranteed hospitals displaying the Red Cross or Red Crescent. These international laws of war bar firing upon or from a religious building.

Religious architecture expresses the religious beliefs, aesthetic choices, and economic and technological capacity of those who create or adapt it, and thus places of worship show great variety depending on time and place.

Buddhism

 Candi, Buddhist sanctuaries mostly built during the 1st to 21st centuries in the Indonesian Archipelago
 Chaitya, a Buddhist shrine that includes a stupa
 Jingū-ji, a religious complex in pre-Meiji Japan comprising a Buddhist temple and a local kami Shinto shrine
 Pagoda, a towerlike, multistory structure usually associated with Buddhist temple complexes of East and Southeast Asia.
 Vihara, a Buddhist monastery found abundantly in Bihar
 Wat, the name for a monastery temple in Cambodia and Thailand

Christianity

The word church derives from the Greek ekklesia, meaning the called-out ones. Its original meaning is to refer to the body of believers, or the body of Christ. The word church is used to refer to a Christian place of worship by some Christian denominations, including Anglicans and Catholics. Other Christian denominations, including the Religious Society of Friends, Mennonites, Christadelphians, and some unitarians, object to the use of the word "church" to refer to a building, as they argue that this word should be reserved for the body of believers who worship there. Instead, these groups use words such as "Hall" to identify their places of worship or any building in use by them for the purpose of assembly.
 Basilica (Roman Catholic)
 Cathedral or minster (seat of a diocesan bishop within the Catholic, Orthodox and Anglican churches)
 Chapel ("Capel" in Welsh) – Presbyterian Church of Wales (Calvinistic Methodism), and some other denominations, especially non-conformist denominations. English law once reserved the term "church" to the Church of England.  In Catholicism and Anglicanism, some smaller and "private" places of worship are called chapels.
 Church – Iglesia ni Cristo, Orthodox, Catholic, Protestant denominations
 Kirk (Scottish–cognate with church)
 Meeting House – Religious Society of Friends
 Meeting House – Christadelphians
 Meeting House and Temple – Mormons Latter-day Saints use meeting house and temple to denote two different types of buildings. Normal worship services are held in ward meeting houses (or chapels) while Mormon temples are reserved for special ordinances.
 Temple – French Protestants Protestant denominations installed in France in the early modern era use the word temple (as opposed to church, supposed to be Roman Catholic); some more recently built temples are called church.
 Orthodox temple – Orthodox Christianity (both Eastern and Oriental) an Orthodox temple is a place of worship with base shaped like Greek cross.
 Kingdom Hall – Jehovah's Witnesses may apply the term in a general way to any meeting place used for their formal meetings for worship, but apply the term formally to those places established by and for local congregations of up to 200 adherents. Their multi-congregation events are typically held at a meeting place termed Assembly Hall of Jehovah's Witnesses (or Christian Convention Center of Jehovah's Witnesses).

Classical antiquity

Ancient Greece
Greek temple, for the religions in ancient Greece

Ancient Rome
Roman temple, for the religions of ancient Rome
Mithraeum, for the Mithraic mysteries

Hinduism
Hindu temple (Mandir), Hinduism

A  Hindu temple is a symbolic house, seat and body of god. It is a structure designed to bring human beings and gods together, using symbolism to express the ideas and beliefs of Hinduism. The symbolism and structure of a Hindu temple are rooted in Vedic traditions, deploying circles and squares. A temple incorporates all elements of Hindu cosmos—presenting the good, the evil and the human, as well as the elements of Hindu sense of cyclic time and the essence of life—symbolically presenting dharma, kama, artha, moksa, and karma.

Islam
A mosque, literally meaning "place of prostration", is a place of worship for followers of Islam.
There are strict and detailed requirements in Sunni jurisprudence (fiqh) for a place of worship to be considered a masjid, with places that do not meet these requirements regarded as musallas. There are stringent restrictions on the uses of the area formally demarcated as the mosque (which is often a small portion of the larger complex), and, in the Islamic Sharia law, after an area is formally designated as a mosque, it remains so until the Last Day.

Many mosques have elaborate domes, minarets, and prayer halls, in varying styles of architecture. Mosques originated on the Arabian Peninsula, but are now found in all inhabited continents. The mosque serves as a place where Muslims can come together for salat (صلاة ṣalāt, meaning "prayer") as well as a center for information, education, social welfare, and dispute settlement. The imam leads the congregation in prayer.

Jainism
Jain temple – Jainism
Derasar is a word used for a Jain temple in Gujarat and southern Rajasthan. Basadi is a Jain shrine or temple in Karnataka
There are some guidelines to follow when one is visiting a Jain temple:
Before entering the temple, one should bathe and wear fresh washed clothes
One should not be chewing any edibles
 One should try to keep as silent as possible inside the temple.
 Mobile phones should not be used in the temple.

Judaism
Synagogue – Judaism
Some synagogues, especially Reform synagogues, are called temples, but Orthodox and Conservative Judaism consider this inappropriate as they do not consider synagogues a replacement for the Temple in Jerusalem. Some Jewish congregations use the Yiddish term 'shul' to describe their place of worship or Beyt Knesset ( Hebrew בית כנסת ) meaning house of assembly.

Mandaeism
Mandi / Mashkhanna / Beth Manda - Mandaeism
A mandi or Beth Manda (Beit Manda or Bit Manda, 'house of knowledge') is a cultic hut and place of worship for followers of Mandaeism.

Norse Paganism
hof – Norse Paganism

Shinto
Jinja – Shinto

Sikhism
Gurdwara – Sikhism

Taoism
Daoguan – Taoism

Zoroastrianism
Fire temple - All Zoroastrian temples fall into the Fire temple category.
 Atash Behram
 Agyari
 Dadgah

Vietnamese ancestral worship
Nhà thờ họ. Historically speaking Vietnamese people venerate their ancestors, as they somehow still exist among them. However, there is a large diversity of religions in Vietnam, Christianity, Buddhism and Cao Dai religion.

See also

Altar
Arming places of worship
Bahá'í House of Worship
Ibadat Khana
Sacred space
Shrine
Religious architecture
Reliquary
List of largest church buildings in the world
List of largest mosques in the world
Temple

References

Further reading

 James P. Wind, Places of worship: exploring their history, Rowman Altamira, 1997
 Vaughan Hart, Places of worship, Phaidon, 1999
 Eric Kang, The Place of Worship, Essence Publishing, 2003